Danny Carroll may refer to:

 Daniel Carroll (rugby union) (1892–1956), Australian rugby union player
 Danny Carroll (Iowa politician) (born 1953), member of the Iowa House of Representatives
 Danny Carroll (Kentucky politician) (born 1963), member of the Kentucky Senate